Seward Mountain is a mountain located in Franklin County, New York, of which it is the highest point.
Seward Mtn. is named after William H. Seward (1801–1872), Governor of New York (1839–1842), and United States Secretary of State (1861–1869). 
The mountain is part of the Seward Mountains of the Adirondacks.
Seward Mountain is flanked to the southwest by Donaldson Mountain, and to the east faces Seymour Mountain across Ouluska Pass.

Seward Mountain stands within the watershed of the Raquette River, which drains into the Saint Lawrence River in Canada, and into the Gulf of Saint Lawrence.
The southeast slopes of Seward Mtn. drain into Seward Brook, thence into the Cold River, a tributary of the Raquette River.
The west end of Seward Mtn. drains into Calkins Brook, thence into the Raquette River.
The northern slopes of Seward drain into Ward Brook, thence into Ampersand Lake, Ampersand Brook, Stony Creek, and the Raquette River.

Seward Mountain is within the High Peaks Wilderness Area of New York's Adirondack Park.

See also 
 List of mountains in New York
 Northeast 111 4,000-footers
 Adirondack High Peaks
 Adirondack Forty-Sixers

Notes

External links 

  Peakbagger.com: Seward Mountain
  Summitpost.org: Seward Mountain
 

Mountains of Franklin County, New York
Adirondack High Peaks
Mountains of New York (state)